The following lists events that happened during 1837 in Australia.

Incumbents

Governors
Governors of the Australian colonies:
Governor of New South Wales - Major-General Sir Richard Bourke
Governor of South Australia - Captain John Hindmarsh
Lieutenant-Governor of Tasmania - Captain Sir John Franklin
Governor of Western Australia as a Crown Colony - Captain James Stirling

Events
 2 January - The Supreme Court of South Australia is established by Letters Patent, five days after the founding of the colony.
 6 March - The Theatre Royal in Hobart opened. It remains Australia's oldest working theatre.
 28 March - The Hoddle Grid of streets for the central business district is surveyed by Robert Hoddle.
 1 June -  First inner-city land sale in Melbourne.
 10 June - The first whale is caught in Western Australia.

Births
 13 February – James Venture Mulligan, prospector and explorer (born in Ireland) (d. 1907)
 26 February – William Hann, pastoralist and explorer (born in the United Kingdom) (d. 1889)
 7 March – Gracius Broinowski, artist and ornithologist (born in the Russian Empire) (d. 1913)
 16 March – Frederick Wolseley, inventor and woolgrower (born in Ireland) (d. 1899)
 1 May – Ernest Henry, explorer and pioneer grazier (born in the United Kingdom) (d. 1919)
 9 May – Ben Hall, bushranger (d. 1865)
 9 August – John Atherton, explorer (born in the United Kingdom) (d. 1913)
 26 November – Thomas Playford II, 17th Premier of South Australia (born in the United Kingdom) (d. 1915)

Deaths
 10 February – Frederick Goulburn, New South Wales politician and soldier (born and died in the United Kingdom) (b. 1788)
 15 March – William Cox, soldier, explorer and pioneer (born in the United Kingdom) (b. 1764)
 5 September – James Ruse, farmer and convict (born in the United Kingdom) (b. 1759)
 Unknown, possibly September – Francis Greenway, architect and convict (born in the United Kingdom) (b. 1777)
 Unknown – Joseph Gellibrand, explorer and lawyer (born in the United Kingdom) (b. 1792)

 
Australia
Years of the 19th century in Australia